Tocharian may refer to:

 Tocharians, an ancient people who inhabited the Tarim Basin in Central Asia
 Tocharian clothing, clothing worn by those people
 Tocharian languages, two (or perhaps three) Indo-European languages spoken by those people
 Tocharian script, the script used to write the Tocharian languages

Language and nationality disambiguation pages